Julien Audy (born 21 November 1984) is a French rugby union player. His position is Scrum-half and he currently plays for US Oyonnax in the Rugby Pro D2.

References

1984 births
Living people
French rugby union players
People from Tulle
Rugby union scrum-halves
Sportspeople from Corrèze